Dhananjay Bhimrao Mahadik is an Indian politician from Kolhapur district in Maharashtra state. He is a Member of Parliament in the Rajya Sabha from Maharastra as a candidate of the Bharatiya Janata Party. He was elected to the 16-th Lok Sabha (2014-2019) from Kolhapur as an NCP candidate.

Political career 
In 2004, Mahadik had contested the Lok Sabha election as a candidate of Shiv Sena from Kolhapur against NCP's Sadashivrao Mandlik but lost. After that he parted ways with Shiv Sena and joined Nationalist Congress Party (NCP). But NCP did not consider him as the party's candidate for the 2009 Indian general election. He then unsuccessfully contested the election as an Independent candidate.

He entered Lok Sabha as member of NCP in 2014. On 10 January 2017, Mahadik, along with NCP MLA Hasan Mushrif, former NCP MP Nivedita Sambhajirao Mane, Kolhapur mayor Hasina Faras, and 400 others were arrested for blocking traffic on the Pune-Bengaluru National Highway as part of a protest against the effects of demonetization.

He received Sansad Ratna Award for his outstanding performance in 2017 
and 2018.

After representing Kolhapur in Lok Sabha (2014-2019) he unsuccessfully contested from the same seat in 2019 elections. He lost 2019 Loksabha election against Shivsena leader Sanjay Mandalik.

In September 2019 he along with his NCP colleagues joined BJP.

In 2022, he became a Rajyasabha Member from Kolhapur Constituency, Maharashtra

References

Living people
Nationalist Congress Party politicians from Maharashtra
India MPs 2014–2019
People from Kolhapur
Lok Sabha members from Maharashtra
Rajya Sabha members from Maharashtra
Marathi politicians
Bharatiya Janata Party politicians from Maharashtra
Shiv Sena politicians
1972 births